Valentine City Schools was a school district headquartered in Valentine, Nebraska.

History
In fall 1954 the district had 735 students, and this was down to 719 in fall 1955.

In 1959 the school district got a conditional deed to land owned by the city government on the condition the school district builds an educational facility on the land.

In 1998 the Tioga Burge Public School school district dissolved, with Valentine City Schools receiving a portion of the district area. In 2006 Valentine City Schools merged into Valentine Community Schools, along with various rural school districts.

References

External links
 
Former school districts in the United States
School districts in Nebraska
School districts disestablished in 2006
2006 disestablishments in Nebraska
Education in Cherry County, Nebraska